USS Edward J. McKeever Jr. (SP-684) was a United States Navy patrol vessel and minesweeper in commission from 1917 to 1919.

Edward J. McKeever Jr. was built as a commercial fishing vessel of the same name by Robert Palmer & Sons at Noank, Connecticut, in 1910. On 5 May 1917, the U.S. Navy acquired her from her owners, McKeever Brothers, Inc., of New York City, for use during World War I. Assigned the section patrol number 684, she was commissioned the same day as USS Edward J. McKeever Jr. (SP-684).

Assigned to the 4th Naval District, Edward J. McKeever Jr. performed patrol, minesweeping, towing, and transport duties for the rest of World War I.

On 21 May 1919, Edward J. McKeever Jr. was decommissioned and sold to the Wilcox Fertilizer Company of Mystic, Connecticut.

On 1 September 1919 the fishing steamer went ashore on Sea Flower Reef near Fishers Island, New York.

References

External links

Patrol vessels of the United States Navy
World War I patrol vessels of the United States
Minesweepers of the United States Navy
World War I minesweepers of the United States
Ships built in Groton, Connecticut
1910 ships